The Green European Foundation is a political foundation at European level funded by the European Parliament. It is linked to, but independent of, other European Green actors such as the European Green Party and Greens–European Free Alliance.

Mission
The Green European Foundation (GEF) was founded in 2008. Modelled on many successful national Green political foundations, the mission of GEF is to encourage European citizens to participate in European political discussions and to ultimately forge a stronger, more participative European democracy.

The Green European Foundation organises debates, conducts research and publishes various documents concerning green politics. Though its main office is based in Brussels, GEF aims to reach out to people across Europe and in 2018 it organised 69 events in 17 different European countries. These events included conferences, seminars, workshops and summer schools that aimed to promote study and debate, and provide opportunities for capacity-building and networking. To this end, GEF also runs training sessions for young people under its annual European Green Activists Training scheme, as well as providing free courses on its online educational platform Green Learning.

The Green European Foundation produces an editorially independent publication, the Green European Journal. Launched in 2012, the Green European Journal publishes in print and online articles and interviews on current affairs in Europe and general topics of significance to the European green movement.

Structure
Three stakeholders are at the heart of the Green European Foundation:

 national Green political foundations around Europe; 
 the European Green Party;
 the Green/EFA Group in the European Parliament;

These stakeholders are represented in GEF's General Assembly, which meets on a biannual basis and which has the responsibility of electing the foundation's board. As of January 2019, the following national foundations are represented in the General Assembly as full members:

 Alexander Langer Foundation (Italy)
 Bureau de Helling (the Netherlands)
 Cogito (Sweden)
 EcoPolis (Hungary)
 Etopia (Wallonia, Belgium)
 Fondation de l'Ecologie Politique (France)
 Fundacion EQUO (Spain)
 Green Economics Institute (UK)
 Green Foundation Ireland (Ireland)
 Gréng Steftung (Luxembourg)
 Grüne Bildungswerkstatt (Austria)
 Heinrich Böll Stiftung (Germany)
 Nous Horitzons (Catalonia, Spain)
 , Belgium)
 ViSiLi (Finland)

The following are associate members:
 Federation of Young European Greens (FYEG - Europe-wide)
 Greek Green Institute (Greece)
 Green Thought Association (Turkey)
 Insamlingsstiftelsen Green Forum (Sweden)
 Institute for Political Ecology (Croatia)
 Fundacja Strefa Zieleni (Poland)

Directors
GEF's current directors (as of October 2019) are:
 Klára Berg
 Teo Comet
 Dirk Holemans (Co-President) 
 Vedran Horvat 
 Benoit Monange 
 Susanne Rieger (Co-President) 
 Ewa Sufin-Jacquemart 
 Sevil Turan

Notes

External links

 
 Green European Journal - Online Journal of the Green European Foundation
 GEF Learning - Online learning platform of the Green European Foundation
 Campaign Handbook

Think tanks established in 2008
Political and economic think tanks based in the European Union
Political and economic research foundations
Green politics
Political foundations at European level